Yegor Orlov (born July 20, 1996) is a Russian ice hockey defenceman. He is currently playing with HC Dynamo Moscow of the Kontinental Hockey League (KHL).

On February 3, 2015, Orlov made his Kontinental Hockey League debut playing with HC Dynamo Moscow during the 2014–15 KHL season.

References

External links

1996 births
Living people
HC Dynamo Moscow players
Russian ice hockey defencemen
Ice hockey people from Moscow